Lanshan District is one of two districts of the prefecture-level city of Rizhao, in the south of Shandong province, China, bordering Jiangsu province to the south.

Administrative divisions
As 2012, this district is divided to 2 subdistricts, 6 towns and 1 township.
Subdistricts
Lanshantou Subdistrict
Andongwei Subdistrict

Towns

Townships
Qiansandao Township

References

External links
 Official home page

Lanshan
Rizhao